Mouth of the South may refer to:

 Martha Beall Mitchell (1918–1976), exposer of the Watergate scandal
 Jerry Clower (1926–1998), comedian in the country music industry
 Jimmy Hart (born 1944), professional wrestling manager
 Ted Turner (born 1938), media mogul
 Gary Claxton (born 1966), comedian
 Rival Choir, a Christian metalcore band from Texas (formerly known as Mouth of the South)
 LeeAnne Locken, cast member of The Real Housewives of Dallas